Chukhloma Lake is a freshwater lake in Kostroma Oblast in Russia. It has an area of 48.7 km², and an average depth of 4.5 meters.

The lake is almost circular in shape, with a diameter of 6–7 km. The shores are flat and boggy. The bottom consists of mud and silt. It is frozen from late October to late April. A number of small rivers and streams enters the Chukhloma Lake. It has an outflow towards the northwest, which drains towards the Kostroma River.

At the lake's southeastern shore lies the town of Chukhloma. At its northern shore, in the village of Nozhkino, lies the Avraamiyevo-Gorodetsky Monastery, founded by Avraamy of Galich in the 15th century.

Chukhloma